Walinna  is a village in the administrative district of Gmina Komarówka Podlaska, within Radzyń Podlaski County, Lublin Voivodeship, in eastern Poland.

The village has a population of 384.

References

Walinna